In statistics, local asymptotic normality is a property of a sequence of statistical models, which allows this sequence to be asymptotically approximated by a normal location model, after a rescaling of the parameter. An important example when the local asymptotic normality holds is in the case of i.i.d sampling from a regular parametric model.

Definition 

A sequence of parametric statistical models } is said to be locally asymptotically normal (LAN) at θ if there exist matrices rn and Iθ and a random vector  such that, for every converging sequence ,
 
where the derivative here is a Radon–Nikodym derivative, which is a formalised version of the likelihood ratio, and where o is a type of big O in probability notation. In other words, the local likelihood ratio must converge in distribution to a normal random variable whose mean is equal to minus one half the variance:
 

Example 
The most straightforward example of a LAN model is an iid model whose likelihood is twice continuously differentiable. Suppose } is an iid sample, where each Xi has density function . The likelihood function of the model is equal to
 
If f is twice continuously differentiable in θ, then
 

 
By the central limit theorem, the first term (in parentheses) converges in distribution to a normal random variable , whereas by the law of large numbers the expression in second parentheses converges in probability to Iθ, which is the Fisher information matrix:
 
Thus, the definition of the local asymptotic normality is satisfied, and we have confirmed that the parametric model with iid observations and twice continuously differentiable likelihood has the LAN property.

See also 
 Asymptotic distribution

Notes

References 

 
 
 

Asymptotic theory (statistics)